Harmine is a beta-carboline and a harmala alkaloid. It occurs in a number of different plants, most notably the Syrian rue and Banisteriopsis caapi. Harmine reversibly inhibits monoamine oxidase A (MAO-A), an enzyme which breaks down monoamines, making it a Reversible inhibitor of monoamine oxidase A (RIMA). Harmine does not inhibit MAO-B. Harmine is also known as banisterin, banisterine, telopathin, telepathine, leucoharmine and yagin, yageine.

Biosynthesis 
The coincident occurrence of β-carboline alkaloids and serotonin in Peganum harmala indicates the presence of two very similar, interrelated biosynthetic pathways, which makes it difficult to definitively identify whether free tryptamine or L-tryptophan is the precursor in the biosynthesis of harmine. However, it is postulated that L-tryptophan is the most likely precursor, with tryptamine existing as an intermediate in the pathway.

The following figure shows the proposed biosynthetic scheme for harmine. The Shikimate acid pathway yields the aromatic amino acid, L-tryptophan. Decarboxylation of L-tryptophan by aromatic L-amino acid decarboxylase (AADC) produces tryptamine (I), which contains a nucleophilic center at the C-2 carbon of the indole ring due to the adjacent nitrogen atom that enables the participation in a Mannich-type reaction. Rearrangements enable the formation of a Schiff base from tryptamine, which then reacts with pyruvate in II to form a β-carboline carboxylic acid. The β-carboline carboxylic acid subsequently undergoes decarboxylation to produce 1-methyl β-carboline III. Hydroxylation followed by methylation in IV yields harmaline. The order of O-methylation and hydroxylation have been shown to be inconsequential to the formation of the harmaline intermediate. In the last step V, the oxidation of harmaline is accompanied by the loss of water and effectively generates harmine. 

The difficulty distinguishing between L-tryptophan and free tryptamine as the precursor of harmine biosynthesis originates from the presence of the serotonin biosynthetic pathway, which closely resembles that of harmine, yet necessitates the availability of free tryptamine as its precursor. As such, it is unclear if the decarboxylation of L-tryptophan, or the incorporation of pyruvate into the basic tryptamine structure is the first step of harmine biosynthesis. However, feeding experiments involving the feeding of one of tryptamine to hairy root cultures of P. harmala showed that the feeding of tryptamine yielded a great increase in serotonin levels with little to no effect on β-carboline levels, confirming that tryptamine is the precursor for serotonin, and indicating that it is likely only an intermediate in the biosynthesis of harmine; otherwise, comparable increases in harmine levels would have been observed.

Uses

Monoamine oxidase inhibitor

Harmine is a RIMA, as it reversibly inhibits monoamine oxidase A (MAO-A), but not MAO-B. Oral or intravenous harmine doses ranging from 30 to 300 mg may cause agitation, bradycardia or tachycardia, blurred vision, hypotension, paresthesias. Serum or plasma harmine concentrations may be measured as a confirmation of diagnosis. The plasma elimination half-life of harmine is on the order of 1–3 hours.

Medically significant amounts of harmine occur in the plants Syrian rue and Banisteriopsis caapi. These plants also contain notable amounts of harmaline, which is also a RIMA. The psychoactive ayahuasca brew is made from B. caapi stem bark usually in combination with dimethyltryptamine (DMT) containing Psychotria viridis leaves. DMT is a psychedelic drug, but it is not orally active unless it is ingested with RIMAs. This makes harmine a vital component of the ayahuasca brew with regard to its ability to induce a psychedelic experience. Syrian rue or synthetic harmine is sometimes used to substitute B. caapi in the oral use of DMT.

Other 

Harmine is useful fluorescent pH indicator. As the pH of its local environment increases, the fluorescence emission of harmine decreases. Due to its MAO-A specific binding, carbon-11 labeled harmine can be used in positron emission tomography to study MAO-A dysregulation in several psychiatric and neurologic illnesses. Harmine was used as an antiparkinsonian medication since the late 1920s until the early 1950s. It was replaced by other medications.

Research

Anti-cancer 
"Harmine showed cytotoxicity against HL60 and K562 cell lines. This could explain the cytotoxic effect of Peganum harmala on these cells." Beta-carboline MAO inhibitors, such as harmine, bind with DNA and also exhibit anti-tumor properties. Harmine has been shown to bind one hundred times more effectively than its close analogue harmaline. The consequences of this are currently not well understood.

Harmine has been researched in its ability to inhibit tumors in Lewis-Lung cancer, as shown in mice. Data showed that 15.3 - 49.5% of tumor inhibition was observed in these mice.

Effects on bone and cartilage 
Harmine has been shown to promote differentiation of osteoblasts (bone-forming cells), and chondrocytes (cells in the cartilage)." Harmine was also shown to inhibit the formation of osteoclasts (bone resorbing cells).

Pancreatic islet cell proliferation 

Harmine is currently the only known drug that induces proliferation (rapid mitosis and subsequent mass growth) of pancreatic alpha (α) and beta (β) cells in adult humans. These islet sub-cells are normally very resistant to growth stimulation in the adult stage of a human's life, as the cell mass plateaus at around age 10 and remains virtually unchanged from there on. Other similar drugs have been successful in triggering beta cell proliferation in rats/mice and pigs, however these drugs were met with very limited to no success in human subjects. Harmine was found to increase the diminished beta cell mass of diabetic people to clinically significant levels for a short time: this property proves very useful in a possible harmine-based treatment for both type 1 and type 2 diabetes.

Harmine is known to be a potent inhibitor of the DYRK1A enzyme pathway. This is thought to be the main mechanism by which harmine can induce alpha and beta cell proliferation in vivo. DYRK1A is an enzyme that plays a definitive role in suppressing/regulating cell proliferation, therefore it makes sense that the partial blocking of DYRK1A increases the growth of certain cells, including pancreatic α and β cells. The alteration of many other enzymes and genes that are implicated in cell proliferation have shown no significant results in humans, hence it is still unknown why DYRK1A inhibition specifically can force α and β cells to divide and grow, in humans no less.

Other 
Harmine found in root secretions of Oxalis tuberosa has been found to have insecticidal properties. Harmine has been found to increase EAAT2 glutamate pump expression in central nervous system, therefore reducing glutamate toxicity. Harmine derivative, ZDWX-25 is potential candidate for AD treatment. It potently inhibits GSK-3β and DYRK1A with IC50 values of 71nM and 103 nM, respectively.

Adverse effects  
Harmine has been found to be relatively toxic to humans where symptoms arise at 3mg/kg. These symptoms include behavioral changes such as sleep, tremors, gastrointestinal issues, nausea and vomiting.

Natural sources 
Harmine is found in a wide variety of different organisms, most of which are plants.

Alexander Shulgin lists about thirty different species known to contain harmine, including seven species of butterfly in the family Nymphalidae.

The harmine-containing plants include tobacco, Peganum harmala, two species of passiflora, and numerous others. Lemon balm (Melissa officinalis) contains harmine.

In addition to B. caapi, at least three members of the Malpighiaceae contain harmine, including two more Banisteriopsis species and the plant Callaeum antifebrile. Callaway, Brito and Neves (2005) found harmine levels of 0.31-8.43% in B. caapi samples.

The family Zygophyllaceae, which P. harmala belongs to, contains at least two other harmine-bearing plants: Peganum nigellastrum and Zygophyllum fabago.

History 
J. Fritzsche was the first to isolate and name harmine. He isolated it from the husks of Peganum harmala seeds in 1848. The related harmaline was already isolated and named by Fr. Göbel in 1837 from the same plant. The pharmacology of harmine was not studied in detail until 1895. The structures of harmine and harmaline were determined in 1927 by Richard Helmuth Fredrick Manske and colleagues.

In 1905, the Colombian naturalist and chemist, Rafael Zerda-Bayón suggested the name telepathine to the then unknown hallucinogenic ingredient in ayahuasca brew. "Telepathine" comes from "telepathy", as Zerda-Bayón believed that ayahuasca induced telepathic visions. In 1923, the Colombian chemist, Guillermo Fischer-Cárdenas was the first to isolate harmine from Banisteriopsis caapi, which is an important herbal component of ayahuasca brew. He called the isolated harmine "telepathine". This was solely to honor Zerda-Bayón, as Fischer-Cárdenas found that telepathine had only mild non-hallucinogenic effects in humans. In 1925, Barriga Villalba, professor of chemistry at the University of Bogotá, isolated harmine from B. caapi, but named it "yajéine", which in some texts is written as "yageine". In 1927, F. Elger, who was a chemist working at Hoffmann-La Roche, isolated harmine from B. caapi. With the assistance of Professor Robert Robinson in Manchester, Elger showed that harmine (which was already isolated in 1848) was identical with telepathine and yajéine. In 1928, Louis Lewin isolated harmine from B. caapi, and named it "banisterine", but this supposedly novel compound was soon also shown to be harmine.

Harmine was first patented by Jialin Wu and others who invented ways to produce new harmine derivatives with enhanced antitumor activity and lower toxicity to human nervous cells.

Legal status

Australia
Harmala alkaloids are considered Schedule 9 prohibited substances under the Poisons Standard (October 2015). A Schedule 9 substance is a substance which may be abused or misused, the manufacture, possession, sale or use of which should be prohibited by law except when required for medical or scientific research, or for analytical, teaching or training purposes with approval of Commonwealth and/or State or Territory Health Authorities.

Exceptions are made when in herbs, or preparations, for therapeutic use such as: (a) containing 0.1 per cent or less of harmala alkaloids; or (b) in divided preparations containing 2 mg or less of harmala alkaloids per recommended daily dose.

References

External links 
Harmine entry in TiHKAL • info

Indole alkaloids
Alkaloids found in Nicotiana
Beta-Carbolines
Monoamine oxidase inhibitors
Phenol ethers